Kanbolat Görkem Arslan (born 4 November 1980) is a Turkish actor who graduated from Hacettepe University and is known for his role as Savcı Bey in Kuruluş: Osman.

Filmography

References

External links 
 
 Kanbolat Görkem Arslan on 

Turkish male stage actors
Turkish male film actors
Turkish male television actors
Turkish people of Circassian descent
1980 births
Living people
People from Düzce